Alberni Inlet (formerly known as Alberni Canal) is a long, narrow inlet in Vancouver Island, British Columbia, Canada, that stretches from the Pacific Ocean at Barkley Sound about  inland terminating at Port Alberni. It was named by the Spanish explorer Francisco de Eliza after Pedro de Alberní y Teixidor, Captain of the Free Company of Volunteers of Catalonia who was appointed in the Spanish fort in Nootka Sound from 1790 to 1792. The inlet includes traditional territories of the Ucluelet, Uchucklesaht, Huu-ay-aht, Hupacasath, and Tseshaht peoples, who are part of the Nuu-chah-nulth Tribal Council people.

History

Exposed to the open Pacific, Alberni Inlet has been subject to tsunamis. The largest in historic times was the result of the Good Friday earthquake in Alaska in 1964, and destroyed part of downtown Port Alberni.

One hour later, a second, larger wave of  hit. It was the second wave that caused most of the damage, lifting houses off their foundations and sweeping log booms onto the shore. In total, the tsunami washed away 55 homes and damaged 375 others.

Tsunamis repeatedly hit the First Nations village Huu-ay-aht of Sarita, which is situated on a low sand beach about halfway along the inlet's eastern shore.

Name change
In 1931 there was a recommendation that the name be changed from canal to inlet so that foreign shippers would not mistake it for a canal. As described by the BC Geographical Names Information System:

The name change was officially approved in 1945.

Other inlets on the Northwest Coast continue to use "canal" names - the most notable being Lynn Canal, Portland Canal and Hood Canal.

References

External links
 Information about Alberni Inlet

West Coast of Vancouver Island
Bodies of water of Vancouver Island
Alberni Valley
Inlets of British Columbia